David Okali  is a Nigerian  Emeritus Professor of Forest ecology at the University of Ibadan and former President of the Nigerian Academy of Science who succeeded Professor Gabriel Babatunde Ogunmola in 2006.

References

Living people
Academic staff of the University of Ibadan
Fellows of the Nigerian Academy of Science
Year of birth missing (living people)
Place of birth missing (living people)